
Xianfeng may refer to:

Xianfeng Emperor (1831–1861, reigned 1850–1861), Qing dynasty emperor
Xianfeng Motorcycle, a brand of the Chinese company Yinxiang Motorcycle

Places in China
 Xianfeng County, a county in Enshi, Hubei

Towns
Xianfeng, Chongqing, in Jiangjin District, Chongqing
Xianfeng, Wangkui County, in Wangkui County, Heilongjiang
Xianfeng, Urad Front Banner, in Urad Front Banner, Inner Mongolia
Xianfeng, Yilong County, in Yilong County, Sichuan
Xianfeng, Yunnan, in Xundian Hui and Yi Autonomous County, Yunnan

Townships
 Xianfeng Township, Gansu, in Linxia County, Gansu
 Xianfeng Township, Heilongjiang, in Yi'an County, Heilongjiang
 Xianfeng Township, Inner Mongolia, in Ar Horqin Banner, Inner Mongolia
 Xianfeng Township, Jilin, in Yushu, Jilin
 Xianfeng Township, Sichuan, in Mianning County, Sichuan

Subdistricts
Xianfeng Subdistrict, Baoding, in Jingxiu District, Baoding, Hebei
 Xianfeng Subdistrict, Mudanjiang, in Xi'an District, Mudanjiang, Heilongjiang
 Xianfeng Subdistrict, Hengyang, in Yanfeng District, Hengyang, Hunan
 Xianfeng Subdistrict, Xiangtan, in Yuhu District, Xiangtan, Hunan
 Xianfeng Subdistrict, Bayannur, in Linhe District, Bayannur, Inner Mongolia
 Xianfeng Subdistrict, Nantong, in Tongzhou District, Nantong, Jiangsu
 Xianfeng Subdistrict, Yancheng, in Tinghu District, Yancheng, Jiangsu
 Xianfeng Subdistrict, Liaoyuan, in Xi'an District, Liaoyuan, Jilin